An animal bite is a wound, usually a puncture or laceration, caused by the teeth. An animal bite usually results in a break in the skin but also includes contusions from the excessive pressure on body tissue from the bite. The contusions can occur without a break in the skin. Bites can be provoked or unprovoked. Other bite attacks may be apparently unprovoked.  Biting is a physical action not only describing an attack but it is a normal response in an animal as it eats, carries objects, softens and prepares food for its young, removes ectoparasites from its body surface, removes plant seeds attached to its fur or hair, scratching itself, and grooming other animals. Animal bites often result in serious infections and mortality. Animal bites not only include injuries from the teeth of reptiles, mammals, but fish, and amphibians. Arthropods can also bite and leave injuries.

Signs and symptoms
Bite wounds can cause a number of signs and symptoms
Generalized tissue damage due to tearing and scratching
Serious hemorrhage if major blood vessels are pierced
Infection by bacteria or other pathogens, including rabies
Introduction of venom into the wound by venomous animals such as some snakes
Introduction of other irritants into the wound, causing inflammation and itching

Classification

Bites are usually classified by the type of animal causing the wound.
Many different animals are known to bite humans.

Vertebrates

Companion animals, including dogs, cats, rats, ferrets, and parrots, may bite humans.
Wildlife may sometimes bite humans. The bites of various mammals such as bats, skunks, wolves, raccoons, etc. may transmit rabies, which is almost always fatal if left untreated.
Human bites are themselves capable of doing great flesh damage, but are particularly known for spreading communicable diseases

Involuntary biting injuries due to closed-fist injuries from fists striking teeth (referred to as reverse bite injuries) are a common consequence of fist fights. These have been termed "fight bites". Injuries in which the knuckle joints or tendons of the hand are bitten into tend to be the most serious.

Teething infants are known to bite objects to relieve pressure on their growing teeth, and may inadvertently bite people's hands or arms while doing so. Young children may also bite people out of anger or misbehaviour, although this is usually corrected early in the child's life.

Reverse bite injury
A reverse bite injury (also called a clenched fist injury, closed fist injury, or fight bite) results when a person punches another person in the face, and the skin (and sometimes tendons) of their knuckles are cut against the teeth of the person they are punching. The proximity of the wound is often located over the metacarpophalangeal joint resulting in tendon injury.

The medical treatment of this injury is similar to those of a human bite, but may also involve damage of the underlying tendons.

These injuries should be managed as other human bites: wound irrigation and antibiotics are essential as human saliva can contain a number of bacteria. The nature of these injuries is such that even if the injury is optimally managed, poor outcomes may still occur.

Arthropods
The bites of arthropods have some of the most serious health consequences known. Mosquito bites transmit serious disease and result in millions of deaths and illnesses in the world. Ticks also transmit many diseases such as Lyme disease.

Spider bite
Insect bites and stings
Flea bites are responsible for the transmission of plague.
Mosquito bites are responsible for the transmission of dengue fever and malaria.
Leech bite

Mechanism

Trauma 
A natural consequence of a bite is tissue trauma at the site. Trauma may consist of scratching, tearing, punture or laceration of the skin, hematoma (bruising), embedding of foreign objects, for example a tooth or hair, damage to or severing of underlying structures such as connective tissue or muscle, amputations, and the ripping off of skin and hair. If major blood vessels are damaged, severe blood loss can occur.

Infection 
Pathogen organisms can be introduced into the bite. Some of the pathogens can originate from the mouth of the 'biter', the substrate onto which the injured person or animal can fall or from the naturally occurring microorganisms that are present on the skin or hair of the animal. The advent of antibiotics improved the outcome of bite wound infections.

Rabies
Animal bites where skin has been penetrated, most commonly by dogs and bats, transmit rabies to humans. Rabies from other animals is rare. If the animal is caught alive or dead with its head preserved, the head can be analyzed to detect the disease. Signs of rabies include foaming at the mouth, growling, self-mutilation, jerky behavior, red eyes, and hydrophobia.

If the animal cannot be captured, preventative rabies treatment is recommended in many places. Several countries are known not to have native rabies, see the Wikipedia page for prevalence of rabies.

Treatment
The first step in treatment includes washing the bite wound. If there is a low risk of infection the wound may be sutured. Debridement and drainage of bite wounds was practiced in the pre-antibiotic era, but high rates of infection still occurred. A 2019 Cochrane systematic review aimed to evaluate the healing and infection rates in bite wounds based on if/when they were stitched closed. The review authors looked for studies that compared stitching wounds closed straight away, leaving them open for a short time or not stitching them at all. Due to a lack of high-certainty evidence, the review authors concluded that more robust randomised controlled trials were needed to fully answer this question.

Antibiotics
Antibiotics to prevent infection are recommended for dog and cat bites of the hand, and human bites if they are more than superficial. They are also recommended in those who have poor immune function. Evidence for antibiotics to prevent infection in bites in other areas is not clear.

The first choice is amoxicillin with clavulanic acid, and if the person is penicillin-allergic, doxycycline and metronidazole. The antistaphylococcal penicillins (e.g., cloxacillin, nafcillin, flucloxacillin) and the macrolides (e.g., erythromycin, clarithromycin) are not used for empirical therapy, because they do not cover Pasteurella species.

Vaccinations
Rabies prevention is generally available in North America and the Northern European states.

Tetanus toxoid treatment is recommended in those whose vaccinations are not up to date and have a bite that punctures the skin. Tetanus immune globulin is indicated in people with more than 10 years since prior vaccination. Tetanus boosters (Td) should be given every ten years.

TT = tetanus toxoid; TIG: tetanus immune globulin

Mosquito bites

Antihistamines are effective treatment for the symptoms from bites. Many diseases such as malaria and dengue are transmitted by mosquitoes.

Epidemiology 
Human bites are the third most frequent type of bite after dog and cat bites. Dog bites are commonplace, with children the most commonly bitten and the face and scalp the most common target. About 4.7 million dog bites are reported annually in the United States. The US estimated annual count of animal bites is 250,000 human bites, 1 to 2 million dog bites, 400,000 cat bites, and 45,000 bites from snakes. Bites from skunks, horses, squirrels, rats, rabbits, pigs, and monkeys may be up to 1 percent of bite injuries. Pet ferrets attacks that were unprovoked have caused serious facial injuries. Non-domesticated animals though assumed to be more common especially as a cause of rabies infection, make up less than one percent of reported bite wounds. When a person is bitten, it is more likely to occur on the right arm, most likely due to defensive reactions when the person uses their dominant arm. Estimates are that three-quarters of bites are located on the arms or legs of humans. Bites to the face of humans constitute only 10 percent of the total. Two-thirds of bite injuries in humans are suffered by children aged ten and younger.

Up to three-fourths of dog bites happen to those younger than 20 years-old. In the United States, the costs associated with dog bites are estimated to be more than $1 billion annually. The age groups that suffer most from dog bites are children 5 to 9 years-old. Often, bites go unreported and no medical treatment given - these bites go unreported. As many as one percent of pediatric emergency room visits are for treatment for animal bites. This is more frequent during the summer months. Up to five percent of children receiving emergency care for dog bites are then admitted to the hospital. Bites typically occur in the late afternoon and early evening. Girls are bitten more frequently by cats than they are by dogs. Boys are bitten by dogs two times more often than girls are bitten by dogs.

History 

The bites of humans are recorded during the biblical era. Reports of secondary infection occurring after a human bite in children have been noted in the United States since at least 1910. Morbidity and mortality rates improved with the use of antibiotics.

See also
 Bite force quotient
 Wilderness first aid
 Dog bite
 Dog bite prevention

References

External links 

 
Pain infliction methods
Veterinary medicine